Heloísa Roese (born 14 October 1956) is a Brazilian former volleyball player. She competed in the women's tournament at the 1984 Summer Olympics.

References

External links
 

1956 births
Living people
Brazilian women's volleyball players
Olympic volleyball players of Brazil
Volleyball players at the 1984 Summer Olympics
People from Novo Hamburgo
Sportspeople from Rio Grande do Sul
Pan American Games medalists in volleyball
Pan American Games bronze medalists for Brazil
Medalists at the 1979 Pan American Games